Klumpp (German: variant of Klump) is a surname. Notable people with the surname include:

Christiane Klumpp (born 1976), German rhythmic gymnast
Elmer Klumpp (1906–1996), American baseball player
Erwin Klumpp (1921–2010), Swiss water polo player
Johannes Klumpp (born 1980), German conductor
Werner Klumpp (1928–2021), German politician

German-language surnames
Surnames from nicknames